Babatunde Colenso Akinpelu Johnson  (born 1965) is an Anglican bishop in Nigeria:  he has been  Bishop of Lagos Mainland since 2016.

Johnson was educated at Immanuel College of Theology, Ibadan, King's College London and the University of Kent. He was ordained in 1990 and served his title at  All Saint's, Yaba, after which he was Vicar of   St. John, Aroloya. He became Archdeacon of Apapa and then Provost of the diocese.

Notes

Living people
Anglican bishops of Lagos Mainland
21st-century Anglican bishops in Nigeria
Anglican provosts in Africa
1965 births
University of Ibadan alumni
Alumni of King's College London
Alumni of the University of Kent
Church of Nigeria archdeacons